The 2009 Wests Tigers season was the tenth in the joint-venture club's history. They competed in the NRL's 2009 Telstra Premiership and finished the season 9th (out of 16), only just missing out on a place in the finals series.

The major signing for the 2009 season was Great Britain international, Gareth Ellis.

Season summary 
In late 2008, hooker Robbie Farah was offered a contract with the Gold Coast Titans commencing from the 2010 season. On 13 January 2009, it was announced that Farah had chosen to re-sign with the Wests Tigers for a further four years, until the end of the 2013 season. At the same time, the club appointed Farah as team captain, succeeding Brett Hodgson who had moved on to the Huddersfield Giants.

Only days before the commencement of the 2009 season, Wests Tigers secured Benji Marshall for a further two years, through to the end of the 2011 season.

In November 2008, CEO Scott Longmuir announced the Wests Tigers will move from ANZ Stadium at Homebush to the Sydney Football Stadium at Moore Park for the 2009 season.

Results

2009 Pre-season trials

2009 Season Ladder

2009 squad

2009 Gains and losses

References

External links 
 NRL 2009 season draw

Wests Tigers seasons
Wests Tigers season